The following are the flags of the Republic of Vietnam Military Forces (Vietnamese: Quân lực Việt Nam Cộng hòa). Most of the flags used by the South Vietnam military between 1955 to 1975.



Military schools and academies

Armed services

Corps

Divisions

Regiments

Battalions

See also
 Republic of Vietnam Military Forces
 List of flags of Vietnam
 Flag of South Vietnam

References

 Portrait of the soldier of the Republic of Vietnam

Military of South Vietnam
Military flags
Flags of Vietnam